Fürth is an electoral constituency (German: Wahlkreis) represented in the Bundestag. It elects one member via first-past-the-post voting. Under the current constituency numbering system, it is designated as constituency 243. It is located in northwestern Bavaria, comprising the city of Fürth and the districts of Landkreis Fürth and Neustadt (Aisch)-Bad Windsheim.

Fürth was created for the 1965 federal election. Since 2021, it has been represented by Tobias Winkler of the Christian Social Union (CSU).

Geography
Fürth is located in northwestern Bavaria. As of the 2021 federal election, it comprises the independent city of Fürth, the district of Landkreis Fürth, and the Neustadt (Aisch)-Bad Windsheim district excluding the Verwaltungsgemeinschaft of Uehlfeld.

History
Fürth was created in 1965. In the 1965 through 1998 elections, it was constituency 229 in the numbering system. In the 2002 and 2005 elections, it was number 244. Since the 2009 election, it has been number 243.

Originally, the constituency comprised the independent city of Fürth and the districts of Landkreis Fürth, Neustadt an der Aisch, and Scheinfeld. In the 1976 through 1987 elections, it comprised the city of Fürth and the districts of Landkreis Fürth and Neustadt (Aisch)-Bad Windsheim, as well as the municipalities of Aurachtal and Herzogenaurach from the district of Erlangen-Höchstadt. In the 1990 election, it lost the municipalities from the Erlangen-Höchstadt district. In the 2021 election, it lost the Verwaltungsgemeinschaft of Uehlfeld from the Neustadt (Aisch)-Bad Windsheim district.

Members
The constituency has been held by the Christian Social Union (CSU) during all but one Bundestag term since its creation. It was first represented by Werner Dollinger of the CSU from 1965 to 1972, when it was won by Horst Haase of the Social Democratic Party (SPD) for one term. Dollinger regained it in 1976 and served until 1990. Christian Schmidt was representative from 1990 to 2021, a total of eight consecutive terms. He was succeeded by Tobias Winkler in 2021.

Election results

2021 election

2017 election

2013 election

2009 election

Notes

References

Federal electoral districts in Bavaria
1965 establishments in West Germany
Constituencies established in 1965
Fürth
Fürth (district)
Neustadt (Aisch)-Bad Windsheim